Out of the Depths is a 1921 American silent Western film based on a book by author Robert Ames Bennet and directed by Otis B. Thayer and Frank Reicher, starring Edmund Cobb and Violet Mersereau. The film was shot in Denver, Colorado by Thayer's Art-O-Graf film company. It is now considered a lost film.

Plot summary
Two engineers developing irrigation systems for desert land fall for the same girl. One of the men tries unsuccessfully to murder the other man, who eventually is identified as the girl's long lost brother.

Cast
 Edmund Cobb
 Violet Mersereau

Crew
 Otis B. Thayer Managing Director
 Vernon L. Walker Head Camermaan
 H. Haller Murphy Cameraman

References

External links
 

1921 films
1921 Western (genre) films
Films shot in Colorado
American black-and-white films
1920s English-language films
Silent American Western (genre) films
Films directed by Frank Reicher
Films directed by Otis B. Thayer
1920s American films